Sergey Meladze (born 1 April 1980) is a Paralympic powerlifter who represented Turkmenistan at the 2012 Summer Paralympics. He won a bronze medal in powerlifting at the 2010 Asian Para Games.

References 

1980 births
Living people
Paralympic powerlifters of Turkmenistan
Powerlifters at the 2012 Summer Paralympics
Place of birth missing (living people)
Medalists at the 2010 Asian Para Games
Medalists at the 2018 Asian Para Games